A good day to die (or today is a good day to die) is a phrase historically associated with certain Native American cultures, although it appears to mischaracterize the historical sources, and its actual origin is unclear. The phrase has since been appropriated into other cultural contexts. For example, in the Star Trek franchise, it occurs several times as a Klingon saying, with Star Trek writer Marc Okrand proposing several ways to say the phrase in the Klingon language. Starship Troopers 3: Marauder also features a patriotic song called by the phrase. In another example, Jun Guevaru from the anime Baki Hanma always says the phrase before a fight. 

In 1849 the phrase was reported to have been said by Willbur Fisk, a Methodist minister who had actively proselytized among Native Americans and helped secure a translation of the Bible into Mohawk, twelve days before his death (in 1839): "In the morning he asked Mrs. Frisk what day it was. On ascertaining, he observed, 'This would be a good day to die'".

An 1879 newspaper account relayed a story of Húŋkpapȟa chief Running Antelope using the phrase to save trapper Fred Gerard ("Girard" in the account) from being executed on the orders of Sitting Bull, stating that:

In "Campaigns of General Custer in the North-west, and the Final Surrender of Sitting Bull" published in 1881, author Judson Elliott Walker relates an account from Low Dog, as told to Captain Howe of the Standing Rock Agency: "I [Low Dog] called to my men: 'This is a good day to die; follow me.

In "Black Elk Speaks" published in 1932, recounting the Battle of the Little Bighorn described the warriors under Crazy Horse: "off toward the west and north they were yelling 'Hokahey!' like a big wind roaring, and making the tremolo; and you could hear eagle bone whistles screaming". "Hokahey" is simply an exclamation to draw attention, similar to a coach saying, "Let's do it!" It is likely neither Low Dog nor Crazy Horse ever said "Today is a good day to die", which is the English bastardization of a common Sioux battle-cry, "Nake nula wauŋ welo!" ("nake nula waung"). This phrase means, "I am ready for whatever comes". It was meant to show the warriors were not afraid of the battle or dying in it.

Another author describes it as the ending of a Lakota Sioux prayer.

The 1998 film Smoke Signals plays with this concept:

References

English phrases